The Conca is a river in the Marche and Emilia-Romagna regions of Italy. Its source is Monte Carpegna, which is in the Montefeltro part of the province of Pesaro e Urbino. The river flows northeast near Macerata Feltria and Mercatino Conca before crossing into the province of Rimini. The river then flows past Morciano di Romagna before entering the Adriatic Sea southeast of Misano Adriatico and northwest of Cattolica.

History
During World War II, the British and their allies defeated the Germans in a battle near the Conca. The Conca was part of the German defenses known as the Gothic Line. This battle took place in 1944 and was known as Operation Olive.

References

Rivers of the Province of Pesaro and Urbino
Rivers of the Province of Rimini
Rivers of Italy
Adriatic Italian coast basins